Mulumba Calvin Mukendi (born 27 May 1985) is a former football striker from DR Congo.

Career

MFK Ružomberok
In July 2012, Mukendi joined Slovak club Ružomberok on a two-year contract. He made his debut for Ružomberok against Tatran Prešov on 4 August 2012.

Volga Nizhny Novgorod
In June 2013, Mukendi joined the Russian club Volga Nizhny Novgorod.

FC VSS Košice
On 17 February 2016, he signed a contract with VSS Košice.

References

External links
 
 MFK Ružomberok profile
 FC Cape Town profile

1985 births
Living people
People from Kasaï-Oriental
Democratic Republic of the Congo footballers
Democratic Republic of the Congo expatriate footballers
Association football forwards
Durban Stars F.C. players
MFK Ružomberok players
FK Senica players
FC VSS Košice players
Slovak Super Liga players
2. Liga (Slovakia) players
4. Liga (Slovakia) players
5. Liga players
Expatriate footballers in Slovakia
Democratic Republic of the Congo expatriate sportspeople in Slovakia
FC Volga Nizhny Novgorod players
Russian Premier League players
Expatriate footballers in Russia
Democratic Republic of the Congo expatriate sportspeople in Russia
1. FK Příbram players
Expatriate footballers in the Czech Republic
Democratic Republic of the Congo expatriate sportspeople in the Czech Republic
Expatriate soccer players in South Africa
Democratic Republic of the Congo expatriate sportspeople in South Africa
Expatriate footballers in Ethiopia
Democratic Republic of the Congo expatriate sportspeople in Ethiopia
AmaZulu F.C. players
F.C. Cape Town players
Saint George S.C. players